Sorority House is a 1939 American drama film starring Anne Shirley and James Ellison. The film was directed by John Farrow and based upon the Mary Coyle Chase play named Chi House.

Plot
Alice Fisher is the daughter of Lew Fisher, a grocery store owner. She is surprised when he reveals he has college money for her. Alice goes to a boarding house and becomes friends with roommates Dotty Spencer and Merle Scott. Dotty suggests Alice join a sorority if she spikes up her looks and earns a few more bucks.

Meanwhile, Alice falls in love with Bill Loomis, who is dating Neva Simpson. He asks Alice out for a date and recommends her for a sorority, stating she is actually rich but pretends not to be. When Alice writes her father a letter that she doesn't have the money for a sorority, he sells his store to a chain and receives the money.

Bill and Alice soon fall in love resulting in conflicts, since Bill is still in a relationship with Neva.

Cast

 Anne Shirley as Alice Fisher
 James Ellison as Bill Loomis
 Barbara Read as Dotty Spencer
 Pamela Blake as Merle Scott (billed as Adele Pearce)
 J. M. Kerrigan as Lew Fisher

 Helen Wood as Madam President Martha Lanigan
 Doris Davenport as Neva Simpson (billed as Doris Jordan)
 June Storey as Norma Hancock
 Elisabeth Risdon as Mrs. Scott
 Margaret Armstrong as Mrs. Pettingell Dawson
 Selmer Jackson as Mr. Grant
 Chill Wills as Mr. Johnson

Production
Mary Coyle Chase wrote a play Chi House. It had not been produced when RKO bought the screen rights in April 1938 as a vehicle for Anne Shirley.

The film was originally going to star Shirley, Lucille Ball and Frances Mercer. By August, the title was changed to Sorority House and Dalton Trumbo was writing the script. Ball and Mercer do not appear in the final film.

Tim Holt was originally announced as male lead, intending to be reunited with Anne Shirley from Stella Dallas but this did not eventuate. The male lead was eventually played by James Ellison.

John Farrow was assigned to direct and filming began 7 February 1939.

Veronica Lake was cast in a small role, her first screen part. This was removed in the edit, but the experience encouraged Lake to pursue acting.

Sorority House was a loose reworking of RKO's earlier Finishing School (1934). Scripted by Dalton Trumbo, who'd later get into hot water with the House Un-American Activities Committee for another screenplay about a group of ladies living together, Tender Comrade (1943). This film was later used by the same House committee as evidence of Dalton Trumbo spreading communist propaganda. Trumbo was subsequently blacklisted.

Proposed sequel
The film was described as a "surprise hit" and RKO announced plans to make a sequel with Shirley, Read and Ellison, mostly likely to be directed by Farrow, called Final Exams. (This sequel was announced as early as April. However, no film resulted.

References

External links 
 
 
 
 

1939 films
1939 romantic drama films
American romantic drama films
American black-and-white films
Films scored by Roy Webb
Films about fraternities and sororities
American films based on plays
Films directed by John Farrow
Films with screenplays by Dalton Trumbo
RKO Pictures films
Films about fratricide and sororicide
1930s English-language films
1930s American films